Derrick Kingston Hatchett (born August 14, 1958) is a former member of the Baltimore Colts from 1980 to 1983. He played cornerback.

References

1958 births
Living people
People from Bryan, Texas
Players of American football from San Antonio
American football cornerbacks
Texas Longhorns football players
Baltimore Colts players
Houston Oilers players